The Florida Women's Reception Center (FWRC) is a state prison for women located in Ocala, Marion County, Florida, owned and operated by the Florida Department of Corrections.  

This facility has multiple missions for Florida state female inmates:  "reception, in-patient mental health, faith and character based (programs) and general population."  It has a maximum capacity of 1345 inmates at a mix of security levels, including minimum, medium, and close.  

Prior to August 2013, it was known as the "Lowell Reception Center", reflecting its relationship with the nearby Lowell Correctional Institution, which is the largest single women's prison in the U.S.   The facility is also adjacent to Florida's Marion Correctional Institution, a men's facility.    

FWRC has come under criticism for the quality of its medical care.  Following an audit in September 2015, an oversight board declared a "medical emergency" at the facility, citing at least three individual inmates with untreated life-threatening medical conditions, poor recordkeeping, and other serious deficiencies on the part of the DOC and its medical provider Corizon.

Notable Inmates 
 Rachel Wade – Found guilty of murder in the second degree in the murder of Sarah Ludemann.
 Denise Williams – Found guilty of orchestrating the murder of her husband Jerry Michael Williams.
 Marissa Mowry – Found guilty of raping and getting pregnant by an 11 year old boy she was babysitting, now moved to the Lowell Correctional Institution

References

Prisons in Florida
Buildings and structures in Marion County, Florida
2012 establishments in Florida
Women's prisons in Florida